The Bradyporinae are a subfamily in the family Tettigoniidae (bush crickets or katydids), based on the type genus Bradyporus. First described as a family, "Bradyporidae" (Burmeister, H., 1838), the first use as Bradyporinae was by Brunner von Wattenwyl in 1878.

Genera in this subfamily are mostly distributed in Europe, North Africa, through to temperate/subtropical Asia.

Tribes and genera

Bradyporini
Auth.: Burmeister, 1838; distribution: N. Africa, Europe, western Asia 
 Bradyporus Charpentier, 1825
 Pycnogaster Graells, 1851

Ephippigerini
Auth.: Brunner von Wattenwyl, 1878 - selected genera:
 Baetica Bolivar, I., 1903 - monotypic
 Callicrania Bolívar, 1898
 Ephippiger Berthold, 1827
 Ephippigerida Bolivar, 1903
 Neocallicrania Pfau, 1996
 Platystolus Bolívar, 1878
 Steropleurus Bolivar, 1878
 Uromenus Bolivar, 1878

Zichyini
Auth.: Bolivar I, 1901; distribution: Asia (mostly temperate)
 Damalacantha Bei-Bienko, 1951
 Deracantha Fischer von Waldheim, 1833
 Deracanthella Bolivar, I., 1901
 Deracanthina Bei-Bienko, 1951
 Zichya Bolivar, I., 1901

References

 
Orthoptera subfamilies